The Isaac Yearout House is a historic house in Alcoa, Tennessee, U.S..

History
The house was built circa 1817 as a farm near Pistol Creek for Isaac Yearout. It was inherited by his son Isaac Newton Yearout, followed by his grandson John M. Yearout, who expanded it in 1911. In 1928, the Yearouts sold the house to another family.

Architectural significance
The house was designed in the Classical Revival architectural style. It has been listed on the National Register of Historic Places since July 25, 1989.

References

Houses on the National Register of Historic Places in Tennessee
Neoclassical architecture in Tennessee
Houses completed in 1911
Buildings and structures in Blount County, Tennessee